Alison Claire Britton OBE  (born 4 May 1948) is a British ceramic artist, with an international reputation, known for her large sculptural, slab-built vessels.

Born in Harrow, Middlesex, the daughter of the educationalist James N. Britton, she studied at Leeds College of Art (1966–7), the  Central School of Art and Design (1966–7) and the Royal College of Art (1970–73). She became a Fellow of the Royal College of Art in 1990 and has been a senior tutor there since 1998. She was awarded an OBE for her services to art in 1990.

Her work is found in several collections including the Victoria and Albert Museum in London, British Council Collection and Los Angeles County Museum of Art.

Bibliography
 Britton, Alison. Seeing Things: Collected Writing on Art, Craft and Design. London: Occasional Papers, 2013 
 Britton, Alison. Seeing Things: Collected Writing on Art, Craft and Design. (2nd Edition) London: Occasional Papers, 2022

References

1948 births
Alumni of the Central School of Art and Design
Officers of the Order of the British Empire
British ceramicists
British women ceramicists
People from Harrow, London
Artists from London
Alumni of the Royal College of Art
Living people